Superga is a hill situated on the south bank of the river Po to the east of Turin in north-west Italy.

Superga is known for the Basilica of Superga and its royal crypt, which is the traditional burial place of members of the House of Savoy; for the Superga Rack Railway that connects it to the Turin suburb of Sassi; and for the Superga air disaster of 1949, in which the entire Torino football team, the Grande Torino, perished.

The hill is used in the Milano–Torino cycling race, and since the 2012 edition the finish was moved on the top of the Superga (repeated two times).

External links
 Real Basilica di Superga

Hills of Piedmont
Climbs in cycle racing in Italy